The Hurlingham Polo Association (HPA) is the governing body for polo in the United Kingdom, Ireland, the United Arab Emirates and many other countries. The Federation of International Polo produces the International Rules of Polo through a cooperative agreement with the Hurlingham Polo Association, the Asociacion Argentina de Polo, and the United States Polo Association.

Within its jurisdiction, the Hurlingham Polo Association is responsible for implementing the rules of polo and for disciplining players who commit infractions against these rules. It also designates handicaps for each of the 2,000 or so players in the UK. It drew up the first set of formal British rules in 1874, many of which are still in existence.

History 
The association originated as the Hurlingham Polo Committee in 1875 (which drew up the first English rules). The Hurlingham Polo Committee was re-titled as the Hurlingham Club Polo Committee and expanded to include representatives on the Council from the Services, the County Polo Association (formed in 1898 to look after the interests of the country clubs and to run the County Cup Tournaments), the three London polo clubs - Hurlingham, Ranelagh and Roehampton - and from all associations within the Empire where polo was being played in 1903. Later, in 1925, the Hurlingham Club Polo Committee was re-designated as the Hurlingham Polo Association.

References

External links
The Hurlingham Polo Association (HPA) Website. The governing body for polo in the UK, Ireland, and many other countries.

Polo in the United Kingdom
Polo governing bodies
Organisations based in Oxfordshire
Sports organizations established in 1925
Sport in Oxfordshire
Sports governing bodies in the United Kingdom
Polo
Vale of White Horse
1925 establishments in the United Kingdom